Water motorsports at the Summer Olympics may refer to:

 Water motorsports at the 1900 Summer Olympics
 Water motorsports at the 1908 Summer Olympics

See also
 Olympic results index#Water motorsports

Discontinued sports at the Summer Olympics